This is a list of international co-production films with Brazil.

List

Lists of Brazilian films
Brazil